Ishparsovo (İşbars) is a rural locality (a selo) in Podlesnensky Selsoviet, Sterlitamaksky District, Bashkortostan, Russia. The population was 767 as of 2010. There are 12 streets.

Geography 
Ishparsovo is located 24 km north of Sterlitamak (the district's administrative centre) by road. Talalayevka is the nearest rural locality.

References 

Rural localities in Sterlitamaksky District